This is an incomplete list of holidays in the Comoros

January 1: New Year's Day
March 18: Cheikh Al Maarouf Day, birthday of an Islamic preacher
May 1: Labour Day
July 6: National Day, celebrates independence from France in 1975.
November 12: Maore Day. Since 2005 Maoré National Day has been one of the ways to fight against the presence of France on the Mayotte; it has been a holiday in Comoros since 2006.

Movable holidays 
 Eid al-Fitr
 Eid al-Adha
 Islamic New Year
 The Prophet's Birthday
 The Prophet's Ascension

References

Comoros
Comorian culture
Comoros